Guandu District is one of seven districts of the prefecture-level city of Kunming, the capital of Yunnan Province, Southwest China.

Administrative divisions
Wujing, Taihe, Guanshang, Jinma, Guandu, Xibanqiao, Liujia and Yiliu Sub-district Offices in, Dabanqiao Town and Ala Yi Nationality Village

References 

 Area Code and Postal Code in Yunnan Province

External links 
 Guandu District Official Website

County-level divisions of Kunming